Ross Banville (born 2000) is an Irish hurler. At club level he plays with Shelmaliers, while he is also a member of the Wexford senior hurling team. He usually lines out as a forward.

Career

Banville first played hurling and Gaelic football at juvenile and underage levels with the Shelmaliers club. He was just 18-years-old when he progressed to adult level as a dual player and won a Wexford SFC in 2018. Banville was the championship's top scorer when Shelmaliers won the Wexford SHC title in 2020. He collected a second Wexford SFC medal in 2021. Banville has also lined out for DCU Dóchas Éireann in the Fitzgibbon Cup.

Banville first appeared on the inter-county scene at minor level with Wexford. He was the team's top scorer during the Leinster MHC in 2017. He later spent two seasons with the under-20 team. Banville joined the Wexford senior hurling team in 2021.

Career statistics

Honours

Shelmaliers
Wexford Senior Hurling Championship: 2020
Wexford Senior Football Championship: 2018, 2021

References

2000 births
Living people
Dual players
Shelmaliers Gaelic footballers
Shelmaliers hurlers
DCU hurlers
Wexford inter-county hurlers